The  breaksea cod (Epinephelides armatus), black-arse cod or tiger cod, is a species of marine ray-finned fish in the family Serranidae, the groupers and sea basses. It is endemic to Australia. Its natural habitats are open seas, shallow seas, subtidal aquatic beds, and coral reefs. This species is the only member of its genus.

References

Anthiinae
Marine fish of Western Australia
breaksea cod
Taxa named by François-Louis Laporte, comte de Castelnau
Taxonomy articles created by Polbot